Pramila Bisoyi  (née Swaini; born 15 September 1948 ) is an Indian politician who is the current Member of Parliament in the Lok Sabha from Aska and hails from Chermaria village of Aska block in Ganjam district, Odisha. She has studied up to class 3. Bisoi has been a representative for Mission Shakti, the women's SHG movement of Odisha. She advocates for women's participation in civil society, and has been involved in ensuring their employment. She has been a part of SHG movement for over 18 years. She got married at the age of five in a child marriage.

References

External links
 Official biographical sketch in Parliament of India website

India MPs 2019–present
Lok Sabha members from Odisha
Living people
Biju Janata Dal politicians
1948 births
People from Ganjam district